The Oaks is an original classic greyhound competition, held at Perry Barr Stadium.

It was run at White City Stadium from 1927 until 1958, and gained classic status in September 1939, becoming the seventh classic race but due to the war it was suspended until 1945. The race was held at Harringay Stadium from 1959 until 1987 and then to Wimbledon Stadium in 1988 until 2012.

In 2013 the Greyhound Racing Association (GRA) decided to move the event to sister track Belle Vue Stadium and just five years later, during 2018, it switched to Towcester following the decision by GRA to reduce their major race schedule. A sixth change of venue was necessary in 2018 following the sudden closure of Towcester, leading owner John Turner stepped in to save the event with a late scheduling being organised in December at Swindon Stadium.

In 2021, the race was switched from Swindon to Perry Barr due to the ongoing saga surrounding Swindon's redevelopment.

Venues & Distances
1927 (White City, 500 y) 
1928–1958 (White City, 525 y)
1959–1974 (Harringay, 525 y)
1975–1987 (Harringay, 475 m)
1988–2012 (Wimbledon, 480 m)
2013-2017 (Belle Vue, 470 m)
2018-2018 (Swindon, 480 m)
2019-2020 (Swindon, 476 m)
2021-2022 (Perry Barr, 480 m)

Past winners

Sponsors

1994–1994 (St Mary's Hospital, London)
2005–2014 (William Hill Bookmakers)
2015–2015 (ECC Timber)
2016–2016 (Racing Post GTV)
2017–2017 (Greyhound Media Group)
2018–2018 (John Turner)
2020–2020 (Property 192)
2021–2021 (Arena Racing Company)
2022–2022 (Premier Greyhound Racing)

References

Greyhound racing competitions in the United Kingdom
Sports competitions in Manchester
Recurring sporting events established in 1927
Greyhound racing in London
Sport in Northamptonshire
Sport in Swindon